1. Oberösterreichischer Rugby Sport Club (also known as RC McDonald's Oberösterreich for sponsorship reasons) is an Austrian rugby club in Linz.

History
The club was founded in 2000 by a Czech, Jaromir Jungmann, who had played rugby in Prague before moving to Linz. Their first match was on 17 June 2000 in Vienna.

Honours
 Zweite Österreichische Bundesliga
 2008

Players

Current squad

External links

Austrian rugby union teams
Rugby clubs established in 2000
2000 establishments in Austria